Selvedin Avdić is a Bosnian writer. He was born in Zenica. His debut novel Seven Terrors (2010) was widely acclaimed and translated into English by Coral Petkovich and longlisted for the International Dublin Literary Award in 2013.

He has published several other books including a short story collection called Tenants and other Phantoms, and a biography of his hometown Zenica entitled My Factory. His recent novel A Drop of Joy will also be published in English. 

Avdic runs the online magazine Žurnal.

References

Writers from Zenica
Year of birth missing (living people)
Living people

Bosnia and Herzegovina writers